The Badgett Sisters were an American folk and gospel group from Yanceyville in Caswell County, North Carolina, and recipients of a 1990 North Carolina Heritage Award. The trio began singing together in 1933 and consisted of sisters Celester, Connie, and Cleonia Badgett.

As of 2019, Connie B. Steadman performs as an acappella musician and storyteller solo artist throughout North Carolina.

History
Under their father's tutelage, the Badgett Sisters learned to sing spirituals, hymns, and gospel songs in the jubilee style, a form of unaccompanied close harmony learned from their father, Cortelyou Odell Badgett (1905-1978). They sing in the jubilee style, a form popular in the 1930s and 1940s. The Badgett Sisters began performing at the ages of 4-6. All of the Badgetts' arrangements are original.

Having performed around the world, the Badgett Sisters traveled as far as Australia and performed at Carnegie Hall.

Awards 
1990: North Carolina Folk Heritage Award, awarded to the state of North Carolina's most eminent folk artists.
Old Highway #62 that runs south from Yanceyville, North Carolina, was renamed Badgett Sisters Parkway.

Albums 
1990: Just A Little While to Stay Here
1986: The Voice That Refused

References

American gospel musical groups
American folk musical groups
African-American musical groups
Musical groups from North Carolina
People from Yanceyville, North Carolina